Itlu Maredumilli Prajaneekam is a 2022 Indian Telugu-language social thriller drama film written and directed by debutant A. R. Mohan. Produced by Zee Studios and Hasya Movies, the film features Allari Naresh, Anandhi, Vennela Kishore, Praveen, Sampath Raj and Sritej in primary roles. The film was released on 25 November 2022.

Plot 
Sripada Srinivas is humble human who always helps people in need. He works as Govt telugu teacher & understand the value of telugu language. He along with another English teacher, are appointed as Election officers for tribal villages from Maredumilli forest area. The tribals are initially relucted to cast their votes as past govt did not install a bridge on nearby river and did not provide basic facilities to them since last 30 years. He meets Lachimi while travelling from one village to another. 
Srinivas helps one of tribal woman, named pollamma deliver the child, thereby earning the tribals trust. After this incident, the tribals cast their votes trusting Srinivas. While going back to deliver the EVMs, srinivas & english teacher are ambushed by the tribals, they kidnap both the officers & ask bridge to be installed as negotiation demand. 
In the end, collector fools the tribals by giving them approval papers, then he betrays them after collecting the EVM machines. While returning, they cross paths with Indian gaur herd (locals treat them as Veerabhadra god). Collector being head strong asks cops to scare the herd away, if not kill them. Herd attacks & injures most of the cops including the collector. Hearing all the rucus, tribals come to cops aid, they find injured collector & carry him through the same river to other side. Collector realising his mistake, signs an approval for bridge

Cast 

 Allari Naresh as Sripada Srinivas
 Anandhi as Lachimi
 Vennela Kishore as English teacher
 Praveen as Babu Garu
 Sampath Raj as the District Collector
 Sritej as Kanda
 Kamakshi bhaskarla as pollamma

 Raghu Babu as Market yard secretary Koteswarao
 Kumanan Sethuraman as Village head
 Darbha Appaji Ambarisha as Chief Election Commissioner
 Ravi Prakash as Police SP
 Khayyum as Police Officer
 Keshav Deepak as DSP
 Gemini Suresh as Election Officer
 Shani Salmon

Soundtrack

Release

Theatrical 
Itlu Maredumilli Prajaneekam was released on 25 November 2022.

Home Media 
Zee Telugu and ZEE5 have acquired the film's satellite and digital streaming rights respectively. It premiered on ZEE5 on December 23, 2022.

Reception 
123Telugu gave a rating of 2.75 out of 5 and wrote that "Itlu Maredumalli Prajaaneekam is a film made with honesty. The backdrop, performances and scenes are decent but there is nothing new or gripping that you will see here". Arvind V of Pinkvilla gave a rating of 2.5 out of 5 and wrote that "With a better second half, this film would have been way more watchable". In contrast, The Times of India stated that the film is "an honest social drama narrating the plight of a tribal village", giving the same rating.

References

External links 

 
Itlu Maredumilli Prajaneekam on ZEE5

2022 films
Indian drama films
2022 drama films
Indian films based on actual events
Films about elections
2020s political drama films
2022 thriller drama films
Indian thriller drama films
2020s Telugu-language films
Films set in Andhra Pradesh
Films shot in Andhra Pradesh